Borneo is the largest island in Asia.

Borneo may also refer to:

Borneo (ship), several mercantile and naval ships
Borneo, Nova Scotia, Canada, a community
Borneo F.C., an Indonesian football club
Borneo, a 1937 documentary film by Martin and Osa Johnson
"Borneo", a song by Wolfgang Gartner and Aero Chord from the compilation album Monstercat Uncaged Vol. 1, 2017

See also